In mining, overburden (also called waste or spoil) is the material that lies above an area that lends itself to economical exploitation, such as the rock, soil, and ecosystem that lies above a coal seam or ore body. Overburden is distinct from tailings, the material that remains after economically valuable components have been extracted from the generally finely milled ore. Overburden is removed during surface mining, but is typically not contaminated with toxic components. Overburden may also be used to restore an exhausted mining site during reclamation.

Interburden is material that lies between two areas of economic interest, such as the material separating coal seams within strata.

Analogous uses
Overburden is also used for all soil and ancillary material above the bedrock horizon in a given area.

By analogy, overburden is also used to describe the soil and other material that lies above a specific geologic feature, such as a buried astrobleme, or above an unexcavated site of archeological interest.

In particle physics, the overburden of an underground laboratory may be important to shield the facility from cosmic radiation that can interfere with experiments.

In arboriculture, the word is also used for the soil over the top of the roots of a tree collected from the wild.

See also
 Gangue
 Spoil tip

Notes

References
 Bates, R.L., and Jackson, J.A., (1987) Glossary of geology American Geological Institute, Alexandria, Virginia.
 Haering, K. C.; Daniels W. L. and Roberts J. A. (1993) "Changes in mine soil properties resulting from overburden weathering" Journal of environmental quality 22(1): pp. 194–200.
 McFee, W.W.; Byrnes, W.R. and Stockton, J.G. (1981) "Characteristics of coal mine overburden important to plant growth" Journal of environmental quality 10(3): pp. 300–308.

External links

Mining terminology